"Make It Easy on Me" is a song by American R&B singer Sybil, written and produced by the British team Stock Aitken & Waterman. It was released as the lead single from her third album, Sybilization, in 1990.

While Sybil had landed a deal in the UK with Pete Waterman's PWL Records for her previous album, Sybil, the song was her first direct involvement with the producers Stock Aitken & Waterman, although some of her previous singles had been remixed by the production team and their associates on PWL Records. Sybil later worked with Mike Stock and Pete Waterman on her 1993 album Good 'N' Ready, on which a remixed version of the song is included.

"Make It Easy on Me", a mid-tempo R&B jam, received good reviews (especially for signalling a different, more soulful and mature sound atypical of the producers' Europop fare), but failed to make an impact on the charts, barely making the UK top 100 peaking at #99, and peaking at #52 on the Billboard R&B charts.

Critical reception
Larry Flick from Billboard wrote, "Honey-voiced diva who scored big last year with back-to-back Dionne Warwick covers dives into her new "Sybilization" set and proves that she can tackle original material. Lithe and spirited midtempo charmer should work well at both radio and club levels."

Cover versions
British pop group Steps covered the song on their 1999 album, Steptacular. It was sung as a solo by Lisa Scott-Lee.

Charts

References

1990 songs
1990 singles
Sybil (singer) songs
Song recordings produced by Stock Aitken Waterman
Songs written by Pete Waterman
Songs written by Matt Aitken
Songs written by Mike Stock (musician)
Pete Waterman Entertainment singles
Next Plateau Entertainment singles